The 1979 Avon Championships of Detroit  was a women's tennis tournament played on indoor carpet courts at the Cobo Hall & Arena  in Detroit, Michigan in the United States that was part of the 1979 Avon Championships circuit. It was the eighth edition of the tournament and was held from February 19 through February 25, 1979. Fifth-seeded Wendy Turnbull won the singles title and earned $30,000 first-prize money.

Finals

Singles
 Wendy Turnbull defeated  Virginia Ruzici 7–5, 1–6, 7–6(7–4)
 It was Turnbull's first title of the year and the third of her career.

Doubles
 Wendy Turnbull /  Betty Stöve defeated  Sue Barker /  Ann Kiyomura 6–4, 7–6

Prize money

References

External links
 Women's Tennis Association (WTA) tournament edition details
 International Tennis Federation (ITF) tournament edition details

Avon Championships of Detroit
Virginia Slims of Detroit
1979 in sports in Michigan
February 1979 sports events in the United States
1979 in American tennis